Sidi Abu al-Qasim Abd al-Rahman ibn Abd Allah al-Suhayli (1114 –  1185), was born in Al-Andalus, Fuengirola (formerly called Suhayl) and died in Marrakesh. He is one of the seven saints of that city. Al-Suhayli wrote books on grammar and Islamic law. He is especially well known as an Islamic scholar by his commentary on the sira of Ibn Hisham. Al-Suhayli came to Marrakesh around 1182 at the call of the Almohad sultan Abu Yusuf Ya'qub al-Mansur. He died here three years later, and his zaouia, in a cemetery just outside Bab er Robb (with entrance only allowed to Muslims), hides a former gate in the wall called Bab el Charia. His tomb is visited yearly by many pilgrims. The cemetery Bab Ech Charia, walled today, is built at the place where the Almohad troops of Abd El Moumen defeated the Almoravids in 1147.

Works
al-Rawḍ al-unuf fī šarḥ al-sīra al-Nabawiyya li-Ibn Hišām. wa-maʿahu al-Sīra al-Nabawiyya (7 volumes), 1967
al-Taʿrīf wa-al-iʿlām li-mā ubhima min al-Qurʾān min al-asmāʾ wa-al-aʿlām, Bayrut, 1987
Translation in German:	Die Kommentare des Suhailī und des Abū Ḍarr zu den Uḥud-Gedichten in der Sīra des Ibn Hišam, Schaade, Arthur 1908

See also
Marrakesh
List of Islamic scholars

References

External links
Comments from As-Suhayli and An-Nawawi on independent reasoning http://hoodshaykh.blogspot.com/2006/11/comments-from-as-suhayli-and-nawawi.html
Discussion on  how long Islam and the world in general will last http://www.muslimphilosophy.com/ik/Muqaddimah/Chapter3/Ch_3_52.htm

People from Fuengirola
1114 births
1185 deaths
12th-century Arabs
People from the Almohad Caliphate
12th-century writers from al-Andalus
12th-century jurists